This is a list of plants which includes trees and other herbs, vines, climbers, lianas, shrubs, subshrubs that are native or endemic, found in Cuba.

This list should exclude plants grown, invasive species or introduced by humans (example: weeds).

The endemic genera or species (exclusive of Cuba) are marked by *. This list is sorted in alphabetical order by binomial names. Common names are in parentheses.

A

Acacia belairioides*
Acacia bucheri*
Acacia cornigera
Acacia daemon*
Acacia roigii*
Acacia zapatensis*
Acoelorrhaphe wrightii
Acrocomia crispa*
Agave anomala*
Ageratina riparia
Albizia berteriana
Allophylus roigii*
Amyris cubensis*
Amyris polymorpha*
Ancistranthus harpochiloides*
Annona cristalensis*
Annona ekmanii*
Ateleia gummifera*
Ateleia salicifolia*
Atkinsia cubensis*
Avicennia germinans
Orchids are native

B

Bactris cubensis*
Banara wilsonii*
Begonia cubensis*
Behaimia cubensis*
Belairia parvifolia*
Brya ebenus
Bucida ophiticola*
Buddleja americana
Bunchosia linearifolia*
Bursera simaruba
Byrsonima crassifolia (Nance)

C

D
Dorstenia crenulata*
Dorstenia erythranda
Dorstenia nummularia*
Dorstenia peltata
Dorstenia petraea*
Dorstenia rocana*
Dorstenia roigii*
Dorstenia tuberosa*

E
Encyclia tampensis
Erythrina elenae*
Erythroxylum echinodendron*
Euchorium cubense*
Eugenia aceitillo*
Eugenia acunai*
Eugenia acutissima*
Eugenia bayatensis*

F
Ficus meizonochlamys*

G
Garcinia aristata*
Garrya fadyenii
Gastrococos crispa see Acrocomia crispa
Gaussia princeps*
Gordonia curtyana*
Gyminda orbicularis*

H
Harpalyce maisiana*
Helietta glaucescens*
Hemithrinax compacta*
Hemithrinax rivularis*
Henleophytum echinatum*
Henriettea granularis*
Henriettea punctata*
Henriettea squamata*
Hernandia cubensis*
Hibiscus elatus (Blue Mahoe)
Hieronyma crassistipula*
Hildegardia cubensis*
Hymenaea torrei*

I
Illicium cubense*

J
Jacaranda arborea*
Jatropha integerrima
Juglans insularis*

K
Krokia pilotoana*

L
Licaria cubensis*
Lunania cubensis*
Lunania dodecandra*
Lunania elongata*
Lyonia elliptica*
Lyonia maestrensis*

M
Magnolia minor*
Manilkara mayarensis*
Manilkara valenzuelana
Marcgravia evenia*
Melocactus matanzanus*
Miconia perelegans*
Microcycas calocoma*
Micropholis polita*
Mozartia emarginata*
Mozartia maestrensis*
Mozartia manacalensis*
Myrtus claraensis*

N
Nectandra coriacea 
Nectandra hihua 
Nectandra membranacea 
Nectandra minima* 
Nectandra turbacensis 
Neea ekmanii*
Nowellia wrightii*

P
Pachyanthus pedicellatus*
Phyla dulcis
Picrodendron baccatum (Jamaica walnut)
Pimenta adenoclada*
Pimenta cainitoides*
Pimenta ferruginea*
Pimenta filipes*
Pimenta odiolens*
Pimenta oligantha*
Pimenta podocarpoides*
Pinguicula lithophytica*
Pinguicula toldensis*
Pinus caribaea (Caribbean Pine)
Pinus cubensis* (Cuban Pine)
Pinus tropicalis* (Tropical Pine)
Pisonia ekmani*
Pithecellobium savannarum*
Plinia rupestris*
Podocarpus aristulatus
Pouteria aristata*
Pouteria cubensis*
Pouteria micrantha*
Pouteria moaensis*
Pseudosamanea cubana*
Psidium havanense*
Psychotria cathetoneura*

Q
Quercus sagrana (=Quercus sagraeana)*

R
Rheedia aristata see Garcinia aristata
Rivea corymbosa see Turbina corymbosa

S
Sabal palmetto
Sabal yapa
Sarcomphalus havanensis*
Senna domingensis
Sideroxylon acunae*
Sideroxylon angustum*
Sideroxylon cubense (syn. Sideroxylon confertum)
Sideroxylon jubilla*
Sideroxylon salicifolium
Spirotecoma apiculata*
Spirotecoma holguinensis*
Synapsis ilicifolia*

T
Tabebuia anafensis*
Tabebuia arimaoensis*
Tabebuia bibracteolata*
Tabebuia dubia*
Tabebuia elongata*
Tabebuia furfuracea*
Tabebuia hypoleuca*
Tabebuia jackiana*
Tabebuia oligolepis*
Tabebuia polymorpha*
Tabebuia shaferi*
Tabernaemontana apoda*
Tapura orbicularis*
Terminalia eriostachya
Terminalia diptera syn. Terminalia intermedia
Tetrazygia elegans*
Thrinax ekmaniana*
Trichilia pungens*
Trichilia trachyantha*
Tripsacum floridanum
Turbina corymbosa

U
Utricularia breviscapa
Utricularia cornuta
Utricularia incisa*
Utricularia juncea
Utricularia olivacea
Utricularia purpurea
Utricularia pusilla
Utricularia resupinata
Utricularia simulans

V
Vaccinium bissei*
Vitex acunae*
Vitis tiliifolia

X
Ximenia roigii*
Xylopia ekmanii*

Z
Zamia integrifolia
Zamia kickxii*
Zamia pumila
Zamia pygmaea'See also
Cuban cactus scrub
Cuban dry forests
Cuban moist forests
Cuban pine forests

References

External links
Flora de la República de Cuba online
The Spermatophyta of Cuba – A Preliminary Checklist

Bibliography
 Grisebach, August (1866). Catalogus plantarum cubensium (Catalog of Plants of Cuba). Engelmann, Leipzig. (available at Botanicus.org)
 Grisebach, A.[H.R.] 1862. Plantæ Wrightianæ e Cuba orientali, Pars II. (Monopetalae et Monocotyledones). Mem. Amer. Acad. Arts, ser .2, 8: 503–536.
 Howard, R.A. 1988. Charles Wright in Cuba, 1856–1867. Chadwyck-Healey, Alexandria.
 León, H. (J. S. Sauget) & Alain, H. (E. E. Liogier) 1946-62 (4 volumes); suppl. 1969.Flora de Cuba. 5 Volumes. Havana
 Manitz, H. 1987. Pp. 23–24 in: Las collecciones de Charles Wright en Pinar del Río. IV Conferencia sobre la Flora de Cuba. Resúmenes. Machurrucutu-La Habana.
 Oviedo Prieto, R. 1994. Plantae Wrightianae ex insula Cuba quae in herbario Horti Regii Matritensis asservantur. Fontqueria 39: 165–213.
 Richard, A. (1845). Histoire Physique, Politique et Naturelle de L'Ile de Cuba (Editor: Ramón de la Sagra). Botanique. Plantes Vasculaires''. (Physical, Political and Natural History of the island of Cuba, Botany. Vascular plants)(available at Gallica)
 Sauvalle, F.A. 1870. Flora cubana. Anales Acad. Ci. Méd. Habana 7.
 Urban, I. 1902. Symbolae Antillanae, 3. Bornträger, Leipzig. (reprinted 1964, Asher Amsterdam)

 
Lists of plants
Flora